Osgood's rat (Rattus osgoodi) is a species of rodent in the family Muridae.
It is found only in Lâm Đồng Province in the Central Highlands of  southern Vietnam. Its name references Wilfred Hudson Osgood.

References

Rattus
Mammals described in 1985
Taxonomy articles created by Polbot